Hermann Speelmans (14 August 1906 – 9 February 1960) was a German stage and film actor.

Selected filmography

 Her Dark Secret (1929) - Emil
 Diana (1930)
 There Is a Woman Who Never Forgets You (1930)
 Danton (1931) - Legendre
 The Man in Search of His Murderer (1931) - Jim
 Inquest (1931) - Bruno Klatte, Artist
 Kinder vor Gericht (1931) - August Schulze, Vater
 Checkmate (1931) - Markutius, pensionierter Kriminalbeamter
 No More Love (1931) - Tom
 The Battle of Bademunde (1931) - Hannes
 Der Herr Finanzdirektor (1931) - Albert Boudaine
 The Captain from Köpenick (1931) - Wachtmeister Killian
 At Your Orders, Sergeant (1932)
 Night Convoy (1932) - Banjospieler
 Under False Flag (1932) - Kriminalkommissar Schulz
 Crime Reporter Holm (1932)
 A Shot at Dawn (1932) - Schmitter
 Spoiling the Game (1932) - Erwin Banz - Rennfahrer
 F.P.1 (1932) - Chefingenieur Damsky
 A Door Opens (1933) - Hans Braumüller
 The Roberts Case (1933) - Walther Hartwig, Förster
 A Certain Mr. Gran (1933) - Nica
 Hitlerjunge Quex (1933) - Stoppel
 A Prince's Young Love (1933) - Greschke, Sergeant
 The Four Musketeers (1934) - Gefreiter Eberle
 Ein Mann will nach Deutschland (1934) - Brack, his sidekick
 Herr Kobin geht auf Abenteuer (1934) - Lutz Kobin
 Holiday From Myself (1934) - Georges B. Steffenson, amerik. Großindustrieller
 Ein ganzer Kerl (1935) - Karl Grosse
 Die Werft zum Grauen Hecht (1935) - Otto Menzel
 Verlieb Dich nicht am Bodensee (1935) - Paul Rohr - Musiker
 The Last Four on Santa Cruz (1936) - Kapitän Pieter Streuvels
 Du kannst nicht treu sein (1936) - Max Hölterlin
 A Strange Guest (1936) - Hausdiener Gaston
 Dahinten in der Heide (1936) - Ramacker
 The Man Who Was Sherlock Holmes (1937) - Jimmy Ward (Sherlock Holmes)
 Autobus S (1937) - Jonny Sülken
 Schüsse in Kabine 7 (1938) - Dick Timperley
 Musketier Meier III (1938) - Anton Bahlmann
 Mann für Mann (1939) - Peter Klune
 Who's Kissing Madeleine? (1939) - Maurice Duroi
 Alarm at Station III (1939) - Ströhm, Zollpolizist
 Congo Express (1939) - Chagrin
 Counterfeiters (1940) - Karl Bergmann aka Harry Gernreich
 Unser kleiner Junge (1941) - Ole Thomsen
 Goodbye, Franziska (1941) - Buck Standing
 Familienanschluß (1941) - Kapitän Peter Bräuer
 Vom Schicksal verweht (1942) - Will Rubber Journalist
 Drei tolle Mädels (1942) - Von Randolf
 Münchhausen (1943) - Christian Kuchenreutter
 Meine vier Jungens (1944) - Klaus Christiansen
 Wir sehn uns wieder (1945) - Jupp Mewes - Pionier
 Der Scheiterhaufen (1947) - Gutsbesitzer Schönborn
 In Those Days (1947) - August Hintze / 5. Geschichte
 In the Temple of Venus (1948) - Kai Brodersen
 Vor uns liegt das Leben (1948) - Kapitän Harms
 Search for Majora (1949) - Will Blom
 Poison in the Zoo (1952) - Kriminalrat Walter Glasbrenner
 Shooting Stars (1952) - Arthur Wernicke
 Komm zurück... (1953) - (uncredited)
 A Heart Plays False (1953) - Matz
 Verrat an Deutschland (1955) - Max Klausen
 Bandits of the Autobahn (1955) - Hauptwachtmeister Lüdecke
 Hanussen (1955) - Maus
 Parole Heimat (1955) - Willi
 Ballerina (1956) - Kalborn
 Das Mädchen Marion (1956) - Kalweit, Bereiter
 Von der Liebe besiegt (1956) - Hermann Egli
 Liebe, Luft und lauter Lügen (1959) - Käptn Seemann (final film role)

References

Bibliography

External links

1906 births
1960 deaths
German male film actors
German male stage actors